Goding may refer to:

Places
Göding, or Hodonín, town in the Czech Republic 

People
Charlie Goding (1876–1926), Australian rules footballer
Fred Goding (born 1905), Australian rules footballer
Frederic Webster Goding (1858–1933), American diplomat and entomologist
Maurice W. Goding, (1911–1998) American lawyer, High  Commissioner for the  Trust  Territory  of  the  Pacific  Islands
John Goding, member of The Washington Ballet

See also
Godin (disambiguation)